The Old Bookkeeper is a 1912 American short silent drama film directed by D. W. Griffith and starring Blanche Sweet.

Cast
 W. Chrystie Miller as The Old Bookkeeper
 Edwin August as The Old Bookkeeper's Employer
 Blanche Sweet as The Old Bookkeeper's Employer's Wife
 Edward Dillon as An Office Visitor
 Charles Gorman as In Office
 Harry Hyde as In Office
 J. Jiquel Lanoe as In Office
 Adolph Lestina as In Office
 Joseph McDermott as The Police Sergeant
 Alfred Paget as A Thief
 Vivian Prescott as In Office
 W. C. Robinson as A Policeman
 Jackie Saunders as The Maid
 Kate Toncray as The Landlady (unconfirmed)
 Charles West as In Office

See also
 D. W. Griffith filmography
 Blanche Sweet filmography

References

External links

1912 films
American silent short films
Biograph Company films
American black-and-white films
1912 drama films
1912 short films
Films directed by D. W. Griffith
Silent American drama films
1910s American films